Duncan Chiu Tat Kun (born 1974) is a Hong Kong politician serving as a member of the Legislative Council for the Technology and Innovation functional constituency. He is the youngest child of Hong Kong entrepreneur Deacon Chiu.

Chiu is the President of the Hong Kong Information Technology Joint Council (HKITJC) and the Convenor of Innovate for Future, a think tank representing some technology start-ups in Hong Kong. He is also the Chairman of HKTDC Information & Communications Technology (ICT) Services Advisory Committee and the Chairman of Information Technology Services Committee of the Hospital Authority. Chiu also serves as a chair at Hong Kong Squash.

On 5 January 2022, Carrie Lam announced new warnings and restrictions against social gathering due to potential COVID-19 outbreaks. One day later, it was discovered that Chiu attended a birthday party hosted by Witman Hung Wai-man, with 222 guests. At least one guest tested positive with COVID-19, causing many guests to be quarantined.

In October 2022, Chiu defended the government's decision to grant special COVID-19 exemptions to overseas guests attending the Global Financial Leaders' Investment Summit and Hong Kong FinTech Week, exemptions which will allow them to eat at restaurants and visit other venues when normal arrivals to Hong Kong are banned from eating at restaurants in their first 3 days after landing in the city. Chiu said "Participants of FinTech week and investment summit are all top talent who require special care."

Property 
According to Chiu's January 2022 declaration of assets, he owns land in Hong Kong and Japan, as well as property in Hong Kong, Japan, and the United Kingdom. Additionally, he owns shares in about 40 separate companies.

Electoral history

References 

Living people
HK LegCo Members 2022–2025
Hong Kong pro-Beijing politicians
1974 births